When Gangland Strikes is a 1956 American film noir crime film directed by R. G. Springsteen and written by John K. Butler and Frederick Louis Fox. The film stars Raymond Greenleaf, Marjie Millar, John Hudson, Anthony Caruso, Marian Carr, Slim Pickens and Mary Treen. The film was released on March 15, 1956 by Republic Pictures.

Plot

Cast       
Raymond Greenleaf as Luke Ellis
Marjie Millar as June Ellis
John Hudson as Bob Keeler
Anthony Caruso as Duke Martella
Marian Carr as Hazel
Slim Pickens as Slim Pickett
Mary Treen as Emily Parsons
Ralph Dumke as Walter Pritchard
Morris Ankrum as Leo Fantzler
Robert Emmett Keane as Judge George Walters
Addison Richards as Mark Spurlock
John Gallaudet as Charles Clark
Paul Birch as Sheriff Mack McBride
 Richard Deacon as Dixon Bracket

References

External links 
 

1956 films
American crime films
1956 crime films
Republic Pictures films
Films directed by R. G. Springsteen
1950s English-language films
1950s American films
American black-and-white films